"Fr Fr" ("For Real For Real") is a song by American rapper Wiz Khalifa featuring fellow American rapper Lil Skies. Produced by I.D. Labs and Nostxlgic, It is the fifth single from the former's sixth studio album Rolling Papers 2 (2018).

Critical reception
Kevin Goddard of HotNewHipHop gave the song a "Very Hottt" rating. Preezy of XXL regarded the song as among the "forgettable" tracks of Rolling Papers 2 that "leave much to be desired".

Music video
The music video was released on September 18, 2018. Directed by Cole Bennett, it finds the rappers as employees at a grocery store and also being seen as action figures and household products in scattered scenes. into opening with Wiz Khalifa working as a cashier before abandoning his duties to smoke a joint. Lil Skies, who is working in the meat department, joins him, and they begin a party in the market. While Skies leads a "mosh pit" in an aisle, a woman removes her tops and another one is seen twerking. The store manager shows up and angrily berates the employees, but a worker throws a can of tomato sauce on him, blinding him. They physically remove him from the store and continue partying outside in the parking lot, with more customers and employees joining.

Charts

Certifications

References

2018 singles
2018 songs
Wiz Khalifa songs
Lil Skies songs
Songs written by Wiz Khalifa
Songs written by Lil Skies
Atlantic Records singles